Carl-Axel Acking (March 8, 1910 – June 12, 2001) was a Swedish architect, author and furniture designer, winner of the Lunning Prize in 1952.

Notable works
1950 Siris kapell in Torsby
1955  in Stockholm
1956 "Quality Hotel" Östersund
1965  och Kreditbanken på Södergatan i Malmö
1970 Telefonstation Bellevuegården in Malmö
1972  in Skön

References

External link

1910 births
2001 deaths
People from Helsingborg
Swedish architects
Swedish furniture designers
Konstfack alumni
KTH Royal Institute of Technology alumni